Anthene makala is a butterfly in the family Lycaenidae. It is found in Cameroon, the Republic of the Congo and the Democratic Republic of the Congo (Uele).

References

Butterflies described in 1910
Anthene